The 2013 Campeonato Brasiliense de Futebol was the 38th edition of the Distrito Federal's top professional football league. The competition began on January 19, and ended on May 19. Brasiliense won the championship by the 8th time, while Botafogo and Brazlândia were relegated.

Format
The tournament has two stages. On the first stage, all teams are split in two groups. In first round, each team plays against all other teams in the team's same group. In the second round, each team plays against all other teams in the other group. In both rounds, the two best teams in each group advances to a playoff, where the four teams play to find the team who wins the round.

On the second stage, the winner of the first round plays against the winner of the second round. If the same team wins both rounds, that team is the champion. 

The bottom two teams on overall classification will be relegated.

Qualifications
The champion, the runner-up and the third place in overall standings qualify to 2014 Copa do Brasil. The best team who isn't playing on Campeonato Brasileiro Série A, Série B or Série C qualifies to the 2013 Campeonato Brasileiro Série D.

Participating teams

The Federação Brasiliense de Futebol allows teams from neighbouring states to play in its competition, with the condition that they are sited in cities no farther than 200km from Brasília.

First round (Taça JK)

Standings

Group A

Group B

Results

Playoffs

Semifinals

Finals

Brasília won the First round and qualifies to the Final stage

Second round (Taça Mané Garrincha)

Standings

Group A

Group B

Results

Group A

Group B

Playoffs

Semifinals

Finals

Brasiliense won the Second Round and qualifies to the Final stage.

Final stage

Brasiliense won the 2013 Campeonato Brasiliense.

Final standings

References

Brasiliense
Campeonato Brasiliense